George Walpole may refer to:

 George Walpole, 3rd Earl of Orford (1730–1791), British administrator and peer
 George Walpole (British Army officer)  (1758–1835), British soldier and politician
 George Henry Somerset Walpole (1854–1929), Anglican priest, teacher and author, Bishop of Edinburgh 1910–29

See also 
 Walpole (surname)